Saint-Damase is a municipality located in Les Maskoutains Regional County Municipality in the Montérégie region of Quebec. The population as of the Canada 2011 Census was 2,506. The municipality was created on October 5, 2001, by the merger of the Parish and the Village of Saint-Damase.

Demographics

Population

Language

See also
List of municipalities in Quebec
Jewish Colonies in Canada Accessed October 22, 2012

References

Municipalities in Quebec
Incorporated places in Les Maskoutains Regional County Municipality